Thomas Morgenstern (born 30 October 1986) is an Austrian former ski jumper who competed from 2002 to 2014. He is one of the most successful ski jumpers of all time, having won the World Cup overall title twice with 23 individual wins, the Four Hills Tournament and the Nordic Tournament once each, eight World Championship gold medals (one individual, seven team), and three Winter Olympic gold medals (one individual, two team).

Career
Morgenstern began his ski jumping career in the Continental Cup, winning three events out of four attempts. He made his senior level World Cup debut at the 2002–03 Four Hills Tournament, where he finished 9th in Oberstdorf, 25th in Garmisch-Partenkirchen, 9th in Innsbruck and 6th in Bischofshofen; this placed him 10th overall in the final tournament standings. Five days after the end of the tournament, he won his first World Cup event in Liberec. In the following summer, he won the Ski jumping Grand Prix for the first time.

At the start of the 2003–04 season, Morgenstern suffered a violent accident in Kuusamo, in which he was hit by a gust of wind just after takeoff, forcing him to flip over in mid-air and land hard on his back. He only sustained minor injuries, and managed to recover quickly to continue his success. He was second overall to Sigurd Pettersen during most of that season's Four Hills tournament, finally ending up in fourth place. He won his first team medal with a 3rd place at the Ski-Flying World Championships.

In the next season, Morgenstern won gold medals in both team events (normal hill and large hill) at the Nordic World Ski Championships.

During the 2006 Winter Olympics, he won the gold medals in the individual and team large hill competitions. Further, he won the bronze medal in the single event at the Ski-Flying World Championships in Bad Mitterndorf. By ending up as 5th, Morgenstern achieved his best ranking in the world cup so far.

In the 2006–07 season, he won the large hill team event at the Nordic World Ski Championships. Further, by reaching the 3rd place in the normal hill event he won his first individual medal at world championships. As in 2003, Morgenstern won the Ski jumping Grand Prix.

At the beginning of the 2007–08 season, he won the first six competitions, which is an all-time record. With these six wins he also tied the record for most wins in a row, previously set by Janne Ahonen, Matti Hautamäki and Gregor Schlierenzauer. In early 2008, Morgenstern won a gold medal at the Ski-Flying World Championships in Oberstdorf. Morgenstern won the world cup for the first time, 233 points ahead of Gregor Schlierenzauer.

During the 2008–09 season, Morgenstern could not win any competition, but won a team gold medal at the Nordic World Ski Championships in Liberec.

The 2009–10 world cup again was very modest with only two victories. However, Morgenstern won gold medals in the team events at the Ski-Flying World Championships and the 2010 Winter Olympics.

The season 2010–11 again started very successful by winning four of the first six competitions. Morgenstern further won the Four Hills Tournament for the first time in this season. In January 2011, he won his first ski flying event in Harrachov, and fixed his second victory of the ski jumping world cup with a 5th place at the ski flying competition in Vikersund on 13 February. At the 2011 FIS Nordic World Ski Championships in Oslo he won gold on the normal hill. It was his first gold medal in an individual event at world championships. In the following he further won gold medals in the team events (normal hill and large hill), both times together with Andreas Kofler, Martin Koch and Gregor Schlierenzauer, as well as the silver medal in the individual large-hill event.

On 10 January 2014, he suffered serious head injuries during training for the ski flying event in Bad Mitterndorf. He recovered in time to take part in the 2014 Winter Olympics in Sochi, where he placed 14th in the normal hill and 40th in the large hill men's individual ski jumping events.

On 26 September 2014, Morgenstern announced his retirement from competitive ski jumping. His last jump in competitive ski jumping was when he won the silver medal with the Austrian team at the 2014 Winter Olympics in Sochi.

World Cup

Standings

Wins

Honours
 Gold Merit Badge of Austria: 2004
 Grand Decoration of Austria: 2006
 Austrian Sportspersonality of the year: 2008, 2011
 Part of the Austrian Sportsteam of the year, together with the Austrian ski jumping team: 2005, 2008, 2009, 2011
 Carinthian Sportspersonality of the year: 4 times, including 2008, 2010

Personal life
In 2013 he left his girlfriend of 10 years and went on vacation to Hawaii with his new girlfriend, a physiotherapist. He has a daughter named Lily (born 26 December 2012) with his ex-fiancee.

References

External links
 
 
 
 

1986 births
Living people
People from Spittal an der Drau
Austrian male ski jumpers
Olympic gold medalists for Austria
Olympic ski jumpers of Austria
Ski jumpers at the 2006 Winter Olympics
Ski jumpers at the 2010 Winter Olympics
Ski jumpers at the 2014 Winter Olympics
Olympic medalists in ski jumping
FIS Nordic World Ski Championships medalists in ski jumping
Medalists at the 2010 Winter Olympics
Medalists at the 2006 Winter Olympics
Olympic silver medalists for Austria
Medalists at the 2014 Winter Olympics
Holmenkollen medalists
Sportspeople from Carinthia (state)
21st-century Austrian people